Los Mameyes is a neighbourhood in the city of Santo Domingo Este in the province of Santo Domingo of the Dominican Republic. This neighbourhood is populated in particular by individuals from the middle classes.

History 
The name Los Mameyes came about because of a mango plantation called mameyitos.

It is located in the south coastal park where one of the most important maritime entrances for tourism is the Sans Souci Tourist Port. The geographical area of this sector is comprised from the 27 de Febrero Naval Base to Las Americas Avenue, it also goes around the Columbus Lighthouse Monument as well as the Mirador del Este Park.

Before being urbanized, only a mango plantation and cattle farms were observed, the cattle farms were jealously guarded by two military men on horseback, called Guardia Viejo and Kiclan, there were only two houses at long distances, one was inhabited by a man named Dionico and the other by another man named Bartola, both were a kind of supervisors and mayors.

The first housing occupation dates back to the first third of the XX century, inhabited by the dictator Rafael Leónidas Trujillo Molina, who ordered the construction of Los Mameyes neighborhood, the military men who lived in those houses, only had the right to them, while they were enlisted, that is to say, After the death of Rafael Leónidas Trujillo Molina, Dr. Joaquín Balaguer came to power and decided to donate the houses to the soldiers who occupied them at the time.

There was also the Embassy of Israel, which later became the summer home of the presidents, which today is known as the "National Aquarium".

Notable people

Actors, artists, musicians, writers 
Veronica Medina – merengue singer
Denicher Pol – gospel singer

Journalists 
Franklin Mirabal – sports commentator
Luther Yonel – announcer

Athletes 
Gilberto Reyes – baseball player
 Carlos Santana – baseball player
 Amed Rosario – baseball player
 Rosell Herrera – baseball player
 Michael De León – baseball player
Gelvis Solano – basketball player
Lewis Duarte – basketball player
Yenebier Guillén – boxer
Heidy Rodríguez – karateka

Politicians 
Juan de los Santos – former mayor
Elvin Fulgencio (Pilo) – former deputy
Amado Díaz – deputy

References

External links 

Go Dominican Republic

Santo Domingo Este
Populated places in Santo Domingo